Jay Parker (July 8, 1874 – June 8, 1935) was a starting pitcher who played briefly for the Pittsburgh Pirates during the  season. He was born in Theresa, New York. His older brother, Doc Parker, also pitched in the majors.

Little is known about this player on a Pirates uniform. Parker was 25 years old when he entered the majors on September 27, 1899 with Pittsburgh, starting against the Chicago Orphans. His performance that afternoon at West Side Park, reduced to the bare essentials, matching his career totals: three batters, hit one, walked two, and gave up two earned runs, without making an out to have an undefined ERA. It is sometimes incorrectly displayed as zero or as the lowest ranking ERA when it is more akin to the highest. He played through 1905, but never appeared in a major-league game again.

He had brief stints as a manager in the minor leagues in 1904 and 1914.

Parker died in Hartford, Michigan, at the age of 60.

External links
Baseball Reference
Retrosheet
Sep. 27, 1899 game

Pittsburgh Pirates players
Baseball players from New York (state)
1874 births
1935 deaths
Major League Baseball pitchers
19th-century baseball players
Minor league baseball managers
Lansing Senators players
Des Moines Hawkeyes players
People from Theresa, New York
Cadillac Chiefs players